Myadora striata is a species of saltwater clam, a marine bivalve mollusc in the family Myochamidae.

References
 Powell A. W. B., New Zealand Mollusca, William Collins Publishers Ltd, Auckland, New Zealand 1979 
 Glen Pownall, New Zealand Shells and Shellfish, Seven Seas Publishing Pty Ltd, Wellington, New Zealand 1979 

Myochamidae
Bivalves of New Zealand
Bivalves described in 1835